WLBG (860 AM) is a radio station broadcasting a Variety format licensed to Laurens, South Carolina, serving Laurens County, South Carolina.  The station is currently owned by Southeastern Broadcast Associates, Inc and is licensed by the Federal Communications Commission (FCC) to operate at 1 kW daytime and 12 watts at night.

The station carries a variety of programming, notably Glenn Beck, Coast to Coast AM, and FOX Sports Radio.  The station also produces its own news/talk programming, as well as a few Urban Contemporary shows.

External links

LBG